The Life Story of John Lee, or the Man They Could Not Hang is a 1921 Australian silent film based on the true life story of John Babbacombe Lee. It is a remake of a 1912 film with some extra scenes of Lee's childhood.

Unlike many silent Australian films, a copy of the movie exists.

Plot
John Lee grows up in England and is falsely accused of the murder of Emma Keye at Babbacombe. Characters include his parents; Miss Key's employer, Ned Saw; Eliza Harris and Jane, servants of Miss Keye; Kate Farmer, Lee's sweetheart.

He is sentenced to be executed but the executions fail three times. Eventually, Lee is set free and is reunited with his mother and sweetheart at home.

Production
Sterry and Haldane enjoyed enormous success with the 1912 version of this story, so they decided to remake it. They added extra scenes of Lee's childhood and extra piety.

It was registered for copyright on 8 September 1921.

Sterry registered a play for copyright in 1927 called The Life Story of John Lee or The Babbacombe Tragedy.

Reception
The movie proved very popular at the box office. Sterry and Haldane would often appear at screenings, delivering an oration. Haldane also toured the English speaking world showing this film and providing the oration that accompanied it.

References

External links

The Life Story of John Lee (1921 version) at National Film and Sound Archive
Clip from film at YouTube

1921 films
Australian drama films
Australian silent feature films
Australian black-and-white films
1921 drama films
John Babbacombe Lee
Remakes of Australian films
Silent drama films